Diegelmann is a surname. Notable people with the surname include:

Theo Diegelmann (born 1939), German soccer player
Wilhelm Diegelmann (1861–1934), German actor